Thomas R. Tilley (born March 28, 1965 in Trenton, Ontario) is a Canadian retired professional hockey player who played in the NHL with the St. Louis Blues. He played defense and shot right-handed.

Career 
Tilley was drafted by the Blues in the 10th round, 196th overall in the 1984 NHL Entry Draft. After being drafted, he played for Michigan State for four years, where he developed a strong defensive presence. Immediately after college, Tilley joined the Blues and played his only full season in the NHL during the 1988–1989 season, scoring 23 points. Tilley then bounced between the Blues and their IHL affiliate Peoria Rivermen for the next two years before playing in Italy for another two years. Tilley returned to the Blues in the 1993–1994, appearing in 48 games. He spent rest of his career in the IHL, retiring after the 2000–2001 season with the Chicago Wolves.

Personal life 
Tilley lives in the Kansas City metropolitan area and helps coach youth hockey.

Career NHL statistics

References

External links
 
 

1965 births
Living people
Atlanta Knights players
Canadian ice hockey defencemen
Chicago Wolves (IHL) players
Ice hockey people from Ontario
Indianapolis Ice players
Michigan State Spartans men's ice hockey players
Milwaukee Admirals (IHL) players
People from Quinte West
Peoria Rivermen (IHL) players
St. Louis Blues draft picks
St. Louis Blues players
NCAA men's ice hockey national champions